Robert Lowrance (born 5 May 1954) is a sailor who represented American Samoa.

Lowrance competed at the 1996 Summer Olympics, he was the skipper in the Star Class with Fua Logo Tavui as his crew, after 10 races the pair finished 24th out 25 starters.

See also 
 American Samoa at the 1996 Summer Olympics

References

External links
 

1954 births
Living people
American people of Samoan descent
American Samoan male sailors (sport)
Olympic sailors of American Samoa
Sailors at the 1996 Summer Olympics – Star